The 2016 Pennsylvania 400 was a NASCAR Sprint Cup Series stock car race that was originally scheduled for July 31, 2016. Due to rain, it was actually run on August 1, at Pocono Raceway in Long Pond, Pennsylvania. Contested over 138 of the scheduled 160 laps on the  speedway, it was the 21st race of the 2016 NASCAR Sprint Cup Series.

Chris Buescher scored his first victory at Pocono after the race was called for fog, the race had 19 lead changes among different drivers and seven cautions for 31 laps, and one red flag.

Report

Background

Pocono Raceway (formerly Pocono International Raceway), also known as the Tricky Triangle, is a superspeedway located in the Pocono Mountains of Pennsylvania at Long Pond. It is the site of two annual NASCAR Sprint Cup Series races held just weeks apart in early June and late July/early August, one NASCAR Xfinity Series event in early June, one NASCAR Camping World Truck Series event in late July/early August, and two ARCA Racing Series races in early June and late July/early August.  From 1971 to 1989, and again since 2013, the track has also hosted an Indy Car race, currently sanctioned by the IndyCar Series and run in August.

Pocono is one of a very few NASCAR tracks not owned by either Speedway Motorsports, Inc. or International Speedway Corporation, the dominant track owners in NASCAR. It is run by the Igdalsky siblings Brandon and Nicholas, both of whom are third-generation members of the family-owned Mattco Inc, started by Joseph II and Rose Mattioli.  Mattco also owns South Boston Speedway in South Boston, Virginia.

Outside of the NASCAR races, Pocono is used throughout the year by Sports Car Club of America (SCCA) and motorcycle clubs as well as racing schools. The triangular oval also has three separate infield sections of racetrack – North Course, East Course and South Course. Each of these infield sections use a separate portion of the tri-oval to complete the track.  During regular non-race weekends, multiple clubs can use the track by running on different infield sections.  Also some of the infield sections can be run in either direction, or multiple infield sections can be put together – such as running the North Course and the South Course and using the tri-oval to connect the two.

Entry list
The preliminary entry list for the race included 41 cars and was released on July 25, 2016 at 2:55 p.m. Eastern time.

First practice

Qualifying

Love this track and looking forward to having some fun on Sunday and trying to get to Victory Lane.”

Carl Edwards, who qualified second, said as he "crossed the line, I felt like, 'That’s it.' But after seeing what (Truex) ran, I thought 'Well, maybe I could go back and change this or that,' but that was a really good lap for me. It just was. You can always go back and pick your lap apart, but the last two weeks, Indy and here, I was pretty proud of my lap, and they just got us."

Paul Menard, who qualified third, said he has “had a rough year. We are not where we expected to be and need to be in points, so we had to make a change. Danny (Stockman) came in here and gave us a good car right off the truck. We stuck in qualifying trim all day. We know we have to improve our qualifying that just starts your race off way better. A good way to start it off.”

Qualifying was delayed 20 minutes due to a "glitch" with the laser inspection station. “We had a little bit of a glitch this morning at the opening of inspection with our laser platform,” Scott Miller, NASCAR's senior vice president of competition and racing development, told NBCSN. “We got it rectified quickly.”

Qualifying results

Final practice

Race

First half
The race was postponed from July 31 to August 1 due to rain. Under overcast Pennsylvania skies, Martin Truex Jr. led the field to the green flag at 12:10 p.m. The field mostly rode around until the first caution of the race flew on lap 16. It was a scheduled competition caution for overnight rain. Brad Keselowski opted not to pit and assumed the lead. Jimmie Johnson was tagged for his crew being over the wall too soon and restarted the race from the tail end of the field.

The race restarted on lap 20. Greg Biffle got the jump on Keselowski and assumed the lead as the second caution of the race flew for Martin Truex Jr. suffering a right-front tire blowout and slamming the wall in turn 2. “A lug nut bounced off the ground, fell in behind the wheel behind a pit stop,” Truex said. “It’s just bad luck honestly. I knew something wasn’t right in (turn) one and two and I got real tight off of two on that restart and went down the back and was like, ‘Ah, it feels okay.’ And, as I got closer to the tunnel turn I felt it start to go down and by the time I let off and tried to slow down it was just going straight for the fence.” He was spared a last-place finish by Reed Sorenson, who exited the race on lap 29 with engine issues.

The race restarted on lap 23. Biffle maintained a quarter to half a second gap over the second-place car for a large portion of the run until Joey Logano drove under him in turn 2 to take the lead on lap 33. Bad luck continued for Truex as he cut down his left-front tire and was forced to make an unscheduled stop on lap 41. A number of cars began hitting pit road on lap 49. Jeff Gordon was tagged for speeding and was forced to serve a pass through penalty. He was eventually black-flagged. Kevin Harvick passed Logano going into turn 1 to take the lead on lap 52. He surrendered the lead to pit the next lap and handed it back to Logano. He pitted the next lap and handed the lead to Austin Dillon. He pitted the next lap and the lead cycled to Keselowski. Danica Patrick, Michael McDowell and Ricky Stenhouse Jr. were tagged for speeding on pit road and were forced to serve pass through penalties. Patrick was shown the black flag with the white cross, which meant she was no longer being scored until she served her pass through.

Harvick passed by Keselowski to retake the lead on lap 62. The third caution of the race flew on lap 66 for a two-car wreck on the frontstretch. Exiting turn 3, Aric Almirola made contact with Jeb Burton, came across his nose and made contact with the wall. Kyle Larson opted not to pit when the leaders pitted and assumed the lead.

The race restarted on lap 73. Larson and Dillon battled back and forth for eight laps until Dillon made contact with Larson in turn 3 on lap 82. This allowed Logano to slip by and retake the lead on lap 83. Larson said after the race that he doesn't think "you ever want to expect contact, but obviously we were racing really hard. I was doing all I could to stay in front of him, and he was doing all he could to get by me. We battled hard down the frontstretch one time, and then he got back to my inside into Turn 3. I left him plenty of room. I was just going to try and run side-by-side with him again and try and slow him down on the frontstretch. I guess he got loose underneath me and got into our door. That was pretty frustrating at the time, but it happens to not even really matter. That part of the race doesn't matter at all. It doesn't mean one thing to me." The fourth caution of the race flew on lap 85 for rain in turn 1.

Second half

The race restarted on lap 92. Matt Kenseth, who stayed out under the third caution, hit pit road from second on lap 96. The fifth caution of the race flew on lap 100 for Truex suffering a tire blowout in turn 1. Larson opted not to pit and assumed the lead.

The race restarted with 57 laps to go. The sixth caution of the race flew for a two-car wreck in turn 2. Rounding the turn, Logano was racing Ryan Newman to his outside and Denny Hamlin to his inside when Chase Elliott got to his inside, got loose, got into Logano and sent both of them into the wall. Elliott continued spinning down the track into the inside wall. Elliott said he "came off (Turn 1) and those guys were three-wide, I thought Denny had the best run so I elected to push him and I thought that would be a good move to kind of get him past them and hopefully he would drag me by. I just got next to (Logano) and got in there. I thought I slowed down enough to not get loose, but I got loose and collected him. I apologize to the No. 22 guys – it was completely my fault. I apologized to my guys as well. They gave me a really good car today.”

The race restarted with 51 laps to go. A number of cars began hitting pit road to make their final stop of the race with 37 laps to go. Larson hit pit road with 35 laps to go and handed the lead to Dillon. He pitted the next lap and handed the lead to Casey Mears. He pitted the next lap and handed the lead to Chris Buescher. The seventh caution of the race flew with 29 laps to go for fog in turn 1. The cars were brought down pit road and the race was red-flagged with 22 laps to go. Buescher would win his first Cup race after NASCAR called the race.

Post-race

Driver comments
Buescher said after the race that crew chief "Bob (Osborne) made a good call to hold out on the weather and make sure that we could run as far out on fuel as we possibly could, and it worked out really well. The weather got here just when we needed it to. We're in a good spot, and we can definitely make up those six points. We're going to try and get a lot more than that and be ready when the Chase does start to make sure we can advance as it goes through."

After finishing runner-up, Keselowski said his team "hit the green-flag pit cycle perfectly to take advantage and what was going to give the lead to us and give us the prime opportunity to win the race. Unfortunately, that cloud came rolling in at the right or wrong time, how you want to look at it, to box us out and we ended up finishing second today. We needed about three more laps (before the fog), but it is what it is.”

After finishing third, Smith said he thought "it was obvious we played the same strategy that Buescher and those guys did to get ourselves up there, and as Brad alluded to, the cloud kind of came at just the right time for us. We were within five or six laps of having to pit, but it’s a credit to my guys for seeing the opportunity to do that strategy, and when you’re a small team working hard to try and go up against some of the bigger teams that we do, you’ve got to take the opportunities when they present themselves, and today and this weekend in general, just kind of had that feeling to it with the rain on and off all weekend long, and we were able to make the most out of it, and it’s something I’m proud of them for doing, and happy for Tommy.”

Race results

Race summary
 Lead changes: 19 among different drivers
 Cautions/Laps: 7 for 31 laps
 Red flags: 1
 Time of race: 2 hours, 42 minutes and 15 seconds
 Average speed:

Media

Television
NBC Sports covered the race on the television side. Rick Allen, Jeff Burton and Steve Letarte had the call in the booth for the race. Dave Burns, Parker Kligerman, Mike Massaro and Marty Snider reported from pit lane during the race.

Radio
Motor Racing Network had the radio call for the race, which was  simulcast on Sirius XM NASCAR Radio.

Standings after the race

Note: Only the first 16 positions are included for the driver standings.. –  Driver has clinched a position in the Chase for the Sprint Cup.

References

2016 in sports in Pennsylvania
2016 NASCAR Sprint Cup Series
August 2016 sports events in the United States
NASCAR races at Pocono Raceway